Willem Erasmus Esterhuizen Jr. (1985–2020) was an international lawn bowler from Namibia.

Bowls career
Esterhuizen represented Namibia at four Commonwealth Games; in 2006, 2010, 2014 and 2018. before his untimely death.

In 2019 Esterhuizen won the triples bronze medal at the Atlantic Bowls Championships.

He died in 2020.

His father (also named Willem Erasmus Esterhuizen, born 9 March 1952) competed at the 1998, 2002 & 2006 Commonwealth Games and his mother (Deborah J Esterhuizen, born 11 May 1951) represented Namibia at the 1998 Commonwealth Games.

References

Namibian bowls players
1985 births
2020 deaths
Sportspeople from Windhoek